The Basketball Africa League (BAL) is a seasonal basketball league established in 2019 and first held in 2021. The league is open to national champions of FIBA Africa member countries. The finals of each season are played in a single-game format, which is held at an arena that is chosen by the BAL organisation.

The data below does not include the FIBA Africa Club Champions Cup, the predecessor of the BAL that was held from 1972 to 2019.

Champions
The first parentheses in the champions and runners-up columns indicate the teams' playoff seed. The second parentheses indicate the number of times that teams have appeared in an BAL Finals as well as each respective team's BAL Finals record to date.

Performances

Performance by club

Performance by country
Teams from three nations have been to a BAL final, and teams from two countries have won the competition thus far.
<onlyinclude>

Performance by head coach

Finals hosted by arena
The finals are played in a pre-determined venue, from 2021 to 2023 this was the BK Arena (formerly the Kigali Arena) in Kigali as the BAL agreed with the Rwandan Ministry of Sports.

Top scorer 
Clubs denoted in italics lost the finals in that year.

Players with multiple BAL titles

Notes

References

Finals